Pooluvapatti is a panchayat town in Coimbatore district in the Indian state of Tamil Nadu. It is a western suburb of Coimbatore and lies close to Kerala border. Pooluvapatti comes under Coimbatore Municipal Corporation.

Demographics
 India census, Pooluvapatti had a population of 12,403. Males constitute 50% of the population and females 50%. Pooluvapatti has an average literacy rate of 60%, higher than the national average of 59.5%: male literacy is 67%, and female literacy is 53%. In Pooluvapatti, 11% of the population is under 6 years of age.

References

Cities and towns in Coimbatore district
Suburbs of Coimbatore